Mark Anthony Aguirre (born December 10, 1959) is an American former basketball player in the National Basketball Association (NBA). Aguirre was chosen as the first overall pick of the 1981 NBA draft by the Dallas Mavericks after playing three years at DePaul University. Aguirre played in the NBA from 1981 until 1994 and won two championships with the Detroit Pistons after being traded to Detroit from Dallas in exchange for Adrian Dantley. Aguirre was a three-time All-Star for Dallas. He was also the 1st Mexican-American basketball player to win an NBA title.

College career
While playing at DePaul University, Aguirre averaged 24.5 points over three seasons with the Blue Demons under coach Ray Meyer. In 1981, Aguirre was The Sporting News and Helms Foundation College Player of the Year. He also was the USBWA College Player of the Year and James Naismith Award winner in 1980, and a two-time member of The Sporting News All-America first team. As a freshman in 1978–1979, he led the Demons to the Final Four, where they lost to Indiana State, led by future Basketball Hall of Famer Larry Bird.

The Chicago native played alongside Terry Cummings at DePaul, and found himself in the national spotlight during his three years at the university. Aguirre averaged 24.0 points as a freshman in 1978–79, and led the Blue Demons to the NCAA Final Four. Over the next two seasons he scored 26.8 and 23.0 points per game, respectively, and was named College Player of the Year in 1980–81.

1980 US Olympic Team 
Aguirre was a member of the 1980 U.S. Olympic basketball team but was unable to compete due to the 1980 Summer Olympics boycott. He did however receive one of 461 Congressional Gold Medals created especially for the spurned athletes.

Aguirre declared for the NBA draft after his junior year at DePaul. The Dallas Mavericks selected him with the first overall pick in the 1981 NBA draft.

Professional career

Dallas Mavericks (1981–1989)
Aguirre averaged 20 points per game over the course of his 13-year NBA career. He was selected as the first overall pick by the Dallas Mavericks in the 1981 NBA draft and remained with the Mavericks until 1989. In his first season Aguirre was limited to 51 games and averaged 18.7 points, second on the team to Jay Vincent (21.4 ppg). The Mavericks improved by 13 games in the win column and finished ahead of the Utah Jazz, but were still twenty games behind division-leading San Antonio Spurs.

Beginning with the 1982–83 season Aguirre reeled off six straight campaigns in which his average topped 22 points per game. In the first of those seasons he scored 24.4 points per contest, tops on the team and sixth in the league. The Mavericks continued their ascent, bettering their record to 38–44 to finish ahead of Utah and the Houston Rockets in the Midwest Division. During the 1983–84 NBA season Aguirre averaged 29.5 points per game, second in the league to Dantley's 30.6 ppg. He finished the season with 2,330 total points.

Although Aguirre was the Mavericks' main weapon, he was helped by the emergence of Rolando Blackman (22.4 ppg) and the contributions of role players Brad Davis and Pat Cummings. Dallas finished second in the Midwest at 43–39, and the team made its first playoff trip, beating the Seattle SuperSonics in the opening round before losing to the Los Angeles Lakers in the conference semifinals. In each of the next two seasons the Mavericks posted identical 44–38 records. In 1984–85 they made a quick exit from the playoffs, bowing to the Portland Trail Blazers in the first round; in 1985–86 they defeated Utah and then took the Lakers to six games in the conference semifinals. Aguirre averaged 25.7 and 22.6 points for those seasons.

In 1986–87 and 1987–88 he made the All-Star Team and averaged 25.7 and 25.1 points, respectively, during the regular season. The Mavericks won more than 50 games each year. The 1987–88 edition of the franchise went 53–29, beat Houston and the Denver Nuggets in the first two rounds of the postseason, then extended the Lakers to seven games before losing in the Western Conference Finals. It was the longest postseason run in the Mavs' eight-year history. Both Mavericks single-season scoring records still stand. His 13,930 points as a Maverick rank third in the franchise's history, behind Rolando Blackman's 16,643 points and Dirk Nowitzki's 31,560.

While Aguirre's time in Dallas was full of high-scoring efforts and playoff visits, the Mavericks were postseason underachievers (their only Western Conference Finals visit was the 1988 loss to the Lakers), and Aguirre had repeated conflicts with coach Dick Motta and players like Blackman, Derek Harper and James Donaldson. Then-team owner Donald Carter was a huge fan of Aguirre and hoped he would remain in Dallas for his entire career, but eventually conceded that the gulf between Aguirre and the team was unbridgeable. Midway through the 1988–89 season Aguirre was traded to the Detroit Pistons for Adrian Dantley, who was also one of the league's top scorers, and a first round draft pick on February 15, 1989.

Detroit Pistons (1989–1993)

After Aguirre was traded to the team, the Pistons won the NBA title in 1989. Despite not being a lead scoring option like he was in Dallas, Aguirre played a key role in Detroit's championship run, especially in the Eastern Conference Finals against the Chicago Bulls, where he led the team in scoring with 25 points in a narrow Game 3 loss and averaged 13.7 points and 4.8 rebounds over the rest of the six game series. He showed he could blend into a successful team by taking fewer shots, playing hard on defense, and not complaining when his younger teammate Dennis Rodman's minutes increased. In the 1990 playoffs, which culminated with Detroit repeating as champions with a five-game NBA Finals win over Portland, Aguirre averaged 11 points a game.

The following postseason, Aguirre scored his highest postseason total as a Piston, with 34 points in a Game 4 win over the Boston Celtics in the Eastern Conference Semifinals. However, in the following round, the Pistons would be defeated by Michael Jordan and the Bulls, bringing their title defense to a close. Aguirre played two more seasons with the Pistons in an increasingly limited role, due to both Rodman's play and his own age and injury issues.

Los Angeles Clippers (1993–1994)
In 1993, the Pistons released Aguirre. After he cleared waivers the Los Angeles Clippers signed him for $150,000 for a partial campaign in 1993–94. Through the 1993–94 season Aguirre had accumulated 18,458 points for a career average of 20.0 points per game. He retired in 1994.

Personal life
Aguirre is a Mexican American that has been married to Angela Bowman since January 1988. Aguirre, whose father was from Mexico, at one point considered playing for team Mexico at the 1992 Olympics.

Honors
 Aguirre was inducted into the College Basketball Hall of Fame in 2016.
 Aguirre's #24 was retired by the DePaul Blue Demons.

NBA career statistics

Regular season 

|-
| align="left" | 1981–82
| align="left" | Dallas
| 51 || 20 || 28.8 || .465 || .352 || .680 || 4.9 || 3.2 || .7 || .4 || 18.7
|-
| align="left" | 1982–83
| align="left" | Dallas
| 81 || 75 || 34.4 || .483 || .211 || .728 || 6.3 || 4.1 || 1.0 || .3 || 24.4
|- 
| align="left" | 1983–84
| align="left" | Dallas
| 79 || 79 || 36.7 || .524 || .268 || .749 || 5.9 || 4.5 || 1.0 || .3 || 29.5
|-
| align="left" | 1984–85
| align="left" | Dallas
| 80 || 79 || 33.7 || .506 || .318 || .759 || 6.0 || 3.1 || .8 || .3 || 25.7
|-
| align="left" | 1985–86
| align="left" | Dallas
| 74 || 73 || 33.8 || .503 || .286 || .705 || 6.0 || 4.6 || .8 || .2 || 22.6
|-
| align="left" | 1986–87
| align="left" | Dallas
| 80 || 80 || 33.3 || .495 || .353 || .770 || 5.3 || 3.2 || 1.1 || .4 || 25.7
|-
| align="left" | 1987–88
| align="left" | Dallas
| 77 || 77 || 33.9 || .475 || .302 || .770 || 5.6 || 3.6 || .9 || .7 || 25.1
|-  
| align="left" | 1988–89
| align="left" | Dallas
| 44 || 44 || 34.8 || .450 || .293 || .730 || 5.3 || 4.3 || .7 || .7 || 21.7
|-
| style="text-align:left;background:#afe6ba;"| 1988–89†
| align="left" | Detroit
| 36 || 32 || 29.7 || .483 || .293 || .738 || 4.2 || 2.5 || .4 || .4 || 15.5
|-
| style="text-align:left;background:#afe6ba;"| 1989–90†
| align="left" | Detroit
| 78 || 40 || 25.7 || .488 || .333 || .756 || 3.9 || 1.9 || .4 || .2 || 14.1
|-
| align="left" | 1990–91
| align="left" | Detroit
| 78 || 13 || 25.7 || .462 || .308 || .757 || 4.8 || 1.8 || .6 || .3 || 14.2
|-
| align="left" | 1991–92
| align="left" | Detroit
| 75 || 12 || 21.1 || .431 || .211 || .687 || 3.1 || 1.7 || .7 || .1 || 11.3
|-
| align="left" | 1992–93
| align="left" | Detroit
| 51 || 15 || 20.7 || .443 || .361 || .767 || 3.0 || 2.1 || .3 || .1 || 9.9
|-
| align="left" | 1993–94
| align="left" | L.A. Clippers
| 39 || 0 || 22.0 || .468 || .398 || .694 || 3.0 || 2.7 || .5 || .2 || 10.6
|- class="sortbottom"
| style="text-align:center;" colspan="2"| Career
| 923 || 639 || 30.0 || .484 || .312 || .741 || 5.0 || 3.1 || .7 || .3 || 20.0
|- class="sortbottom"
| style="text-align:center;" colspan="2"| All-Star
| 3 || 0 || 14.0 || .542 || .400 || .800 || 1.3 || 1.3 || .7 || .3 || 12.0

Playoffs 

|-
| align="left" | 1984
| align="left" | Dallas
| 10 || 10 || 35.0 || .478 || .000 || .772 || 7.6 || 3.2 || .5 || .5 || 22.0
|-
| align="left" | 1985
| align="left" | Dallas
| 4 || 4 || 41.0 || .494 || .500 || .844 || 7.5 || 4.0 || .8 || .0 || 29.0
|-
| align="left" | 1986
| align="left" | Dallas
| 10 || 10 || 34.5 || .491 || .333 || .363 || 7.1 || 5.4 || .9 || .0 || 24.7
|-
| align="left" | 1987
| align="left" | Dallas
| 4 || 4 || 32.5 || .500 || .000 || .767 || 6.0 || 2.0 || 2.0 || .0 || 21.3
|-
| align="left" | 1988
| align="left" | Dallas
| 17 || 17 || 21.6 || .500 || .382 || .698 || 5.9 || 3.3 || .8 || .5 || 21.6
|-
| style="text-align:left;background:#afe6ba;"| 1989†
| align="left" | Detroit
| 17 || 17 || 27.2 || .489 || .276 || .737 || 4.4 || 1.6 || .5 || .2 || 12.6
|-
| style="text-align:left;background:#afe6ba;"| 1990†
| align="left" | Detroit
| 20 || 3 || 22.0 || .467 || .333 || .750 || 4.6 || 1.4 || .5 || .2 || 11.0
|-
| align="left" | 1991
| align="left" | Detroit
| 15 || 2 || 26.5 || .506 || .364 || .824 || 4.1 || 1.9 || .8 || .1 || 15.6
|-
| align="left" | 1992
| align="left" | Detroit
| 5 || 0 || 22.6 || .333 || .200 || .750 || 1.8 || 2.4 || .4 || .2 || 9.0
|- class="sortbottom"
| style="text-align:center;" colspan="2"| Career
| 102 || 67 || 29.0 || .485 || .317 || .743 || 5.3 || 2.6 || .7 || .2 || 17.1

References

External links 
nba.com historical playerfile
 Career Statistics
 1980 Oscar Robertson Trophy USBWA College Player of the Year

1959 births
Living people
African-American basketball players
All-American college men's basketball players
American men's basketball players
American sportspeople of Mexican descent
Basketball coaches from Illinois
Basketball players from Chicago
Congressional Gold Medal recipients
Dallas Mavericks draft picks
Dallas Mavericks players
DePaul Blue Demons men's basketball players
Detroit Pistons players
George Westinghouse College Prep alumni
Indiana Pacers assistant coaches
Los Angeles Clippers players
McDonald's High School All-Americans
National Basketball Association All-Stars
New York Knicks assistant coaches
Parade High School All-Americans (boys' basketball)
Small forwards
21st-century African-American people
20th-century African-American sportspeople